Judy Waite is an author of picture books for young children and novels for young adults, as well as poetry and short stories.  Her books have won several awards, including the English Association Best Children's Picture Book (1998) for Mouse Look Out and Children's Book Federation for Laura's Star.

Waite currently teaches Creative Writing at the University of Winchester.

List of works

Picture books
Look Out the Window
Digging for Dinosaurs
I Wish I Had a Monster
Fox Beware
Mouse Look Out (award-winning)
The Storm Seal
The Stray Kitten

Children's books
Robbie in The River
Animal Heroes
Pet Rescue
Eerie Encounters
A Prince Among Donkeys
Tiger Hunt
A Mammoth Mistake
Foul Play
The Singing Princess
Deep Water
Star Striker
Cheat

Young adult books
Forbidden
Shopaholic
Shadow
Trick of the Mind
Game Girls
Twisting the Truth

References

External links

 
 
 

Living people
English children's writers
English illustrators
English women poets
English short story writers
Writing teachers
British art teachers
British women short story writers
Year of birth missing (living people)
Place of birth missing (living people)